The Częstochowa tram system is a tram system in Częstochowa, Poland.

History
Intensive growth of the city, extension of the steelworks and sharp increase in its workforce, and construction of new residential suburbs meant that bus-based public communication was overloaded. In 1952 a decision was made to build a tram line. Works started in 1955. The network was designed to run along separate right of way but with level crossings.

On 21 July 1959 a second line was opened. It was single-tracked and ran along Łukasińskiego, terminating past the intersection with Okrzei. It was the only single-track section of the network and the only one to be street running.

At the beginning of 1971 the line was extended north to Kiedrzyńska. On 31 August of the same year the trams stopped running along Łukasińskiego.

On 16 January 1984, a further extension of the line was opened. The new section connected Kiedrzyńska with Fieldorfa-Nila.

In 2012 a  extension to Raków was opened.

On 20 March 2019 a network renewal programme started. On 1 September 2021 trams resumed running between Fieldorfa-Nila and Stadion Raków, the section to Raków Dworzec PKP is completed and is due to open by mid-October, pending the completion of roadworks in the area. Work on the section to Kucelin has not started yet. Trams to Raków Dworzec PKP started running again on 1 October 2021.

Rolling stock

Lines 

(The italicized lines and sections are out of service.)

References

External links

 

Częstochowa
Częstochowa
Częstochowa